WWE Payback was a professional wrestling event produced by WWE, a Connecticut-based professional wrestling promotion. It was broadcast live and available only through pay-per-view (PPV) and the WWE Network. The concept of the event was the wrestlers seeking payback against their opponents.

The event was established in 2013 and replaced No Way Out in the mid-June slot of WWE's pay-per-view calendar. It continued to be held annually until 2017; in 2015, the event moved up to the May slot, and was then moved to late-April in 2017. To coincide with the WWE brand extension that was reintroduced in 2016, the 2017 event was held exclusively for wrestlers from the Raw brand. Payback was then dropped from WWE's PPV calendar for 2018 as following WrestleMania 34 that year, WWE discontinued brand-exclusive PPVs, resulting in the reduction of PPVs produced yearly. After a three-year hiatus, Payback made a one-off return in late August 2020.

History
In 2012, WWE reinstated their No Way Out pay-per-view (PPV), which had previously ran annually from 1999 to 2009. The following year, however, No Way Out was canceled and replaced by a new event called Payback. The concept of the event was the wrestlers seeking payback against their opponents. The inaugural Payback event was held on June 16, 2013, at the Allstate Arena in the Chicago suburb of Rosemont, Illinois. 

The 2014 event in turn established Payback as an annual event for the promotion. It was also held in June at the same arena and was also the first Payback to air on WWE's online streaming service, the WWE Network, which had launched earlier that year in February. In 2015 and 2016, the event was held in May. The 2016 event was also promoted as the first PPV of The New Era for WWE. In July 2016, WWE reintroduced the brand extension, dividing the roster between the Raw and SmackDown brands where wrestlers were exclusively assigned to perform. The 2017 event was in turn held exclusively for wrestlers from the Raw brand, and was also moved up to late-April. 

The event was expected to return in 2018 as a SmackDown-exclusive event, however, following WrestleMania 34 that year, WWE discontinued brand-exclusive PPVs. As a result, Payback was discontinued due to a reduction in the amount of yearly PPVs produced. Following a three-year hiatus, however, Payback was reinstated in 2020 and held in late August. Due to the COVID-19 pandemic, the 2020 event was held in WWE's bio-secure bubble called the WWE ThunderDome, hosted at the Amway Center in Orlando, Florida. The 2020 event would in turn be the last Payback as an event was not scheduled for 2021, and no further events have been scheduled since.

Events

See also 
 List of WWE Network events
 List of WWE pay-per-view events

References

External links 
 

 
Recurring events established in 2013